Afonso Cláudio may refer to:

 Afonso Cláudio (politician) (1859–1934), Brazilian politician, teacher and poet
 Afonso Cláudio, Espírito Santo, municipality in Brazil named after the politician